Martin Mosebach (born 31 July 1951, in Frankfurt am Main) is a German writer.

Biography
He has published novels, stories, and collections of poems, written scripts for several films, opera libretti, theatre and radio plays.  His first major non-fiction work is the book The 21 - A Journey into the Land of Coptic Martyrs detailing his visit to Egypt to examine the lives of the 21 Coptic martyrs beheaded by ISIS in 2015.

The German Academy for Language and Literature praised him for "combining stylistic splendour with original storytelling that demonstrates a humorous awareness of history."
 
He is a Traditionalist Roman Catholic. Among Mosebach's works translated into English is The Heresy of Formlessness, a collection of essays on the Latin language Tridentine Mass and its replacement  by the vernacular Mass of Paul VI, as viewed from the perspective of a Catholic author and intellectual. It has been published in the United States by Ignatius Press. The book argues for a return to the Tridentine Mass, about which the 2007 motu proprio Summorum Pontificum declared that, rather than a "rite", it is a form of the one Roman Rite, stating also that the 1962 Roman Missal, which contained its final form, had never been formally abrogated.

Other works include The Turkish Woman, The Tremor, The Long Night and Prince of Mist, in which the author examines the motives behind man's eternal search for a meaning.

Awards
Mosebach was awarded the Kleist Prize in 2002. In 2007, he was awarded the Georg Büchner Prize.

Publications
The following is a partial list of publications written by Mosebach:

Novels

 1983: Das Bett (The Bed)  
 1985: Ruppertshain 3-423-13159-4 
 1992: Westend  
 1999: Die Türkin (The Turkish Woman)  
 2000: Eine lange Nacht (A Long Night)  
 2001: Der Nebelfürst (Prince of the Mist) 
 2005: Das Beben (The Tremor) 
 2007: Der Mond und das Mädchen (The Moon and the Maiden) 
 2010: What Was Before (Was davor geschah) 
 2014: Das Blutbuchenfest

Short story collections

 1995 Das Kissenbuch : Gedichte und Zeichnungen 
 1995 Stilleben mit wildem Tier: Erzählungen  
 1996 Das Grab Der Pulcinellen: Erzählungen, Pasticci, Phantasien 
 1997 Die Schöne Gewohnheit zu Leben: eine italienische Reise 
 2008 Stadt der wilden Hunde: Nachrichten aus dem alltäglichen Indien

Essays

 2002 Häresie der Formlosigkeit : die römische Liturgie und ihr Feind (The Heresy of Formlessness) 
 2002 Mein Frankfurt 
 2006 Schöne Literatur: Essays 
 2012 Der Ultramontane

Non-fiction 

 2019 The 21 - A Journey into the Land of Coptic Martyrs

References

External links
 
 Mosebach Winner of Büchnerpreis

1951 births
20th-century German novelists
21st-century German novelists
German essayists
German traditionalist Catholics
Traditionalist Catholic writers
Living people
German Roman Catholics
German Catholic poets
Kleist Prize winners
Georg Büchner Prize winners
Members of the Academy of Arts, Berlin
German male essayists
German male novelists
German male dramatists and playwrights
20th-century German dramatists and playwrights
21st-century German dramatists and playwrights
20th-century essayists
21st-century essayists
20th-century German male writers
21st-century German male writers